John Tuchet, 8th Baron Audley, 5th Baron Tuchet (c. 1483 – before 20 January 1557) was an English peer.

Family
John Tuchet was the son of Sir James Tuchet, 7th Baron Audley (c. 1463 - 1497) by his first wife, Margaret Dayrell, the daughter of Richard Dayrell of Littlecote, Wiltshire by Margaret Beaufort, Countess of Stafford, widow of Humphrey Stafford, styled Earl of Stafford, and daughter and coheir of Edmund Beaufort, 2nd Duke of Somerset.

Marriage and issue
He married Mary Griffin, daughter of John Griffin, 9th Baron of Latimer of Braybrook. He acquired his titles by writ in 1512 after they had been forfeited to his father in 1497 for taking part in the Cornish Rebellion. He was restored as Lord Audley in name, blood, title and estate by an act of restitution in 1512.

He died before 20 January 1557 and was succeeded by his only son, George Tuchet, 9th Baron Audley (died 1560).

Notes

References

External links
ThePeerage.com entry

|-

1480s births
1557 deaths
08
16th-century English nobility
Year of birth uncertain